The PinePhone Pro is a smartphone developed by Hong Kong-based computer manufacturer Pine64. The phone is the successor to the PinePhone released in 2019. The default operating system is Manjaro ARM, with Plasma Mobile as the user interface. The device is a developer platform with open hardware specifications but with unfinished software. The target group of the device is free and open-source software developers who will develop the software. The device was first shipped to developers in December 2021, and in February 2022 devices were made available to consumers.

Hardware 
The device is built on the Rockchip RK3399S system on a chip, which is a custom version of the stock RK3399, uniquely designed for the device. The processing power roughly compares to mid-range phones from 2016. The device has 4GB of ram, a 6" inch display, 13MP Sony IMX258 as the main camera, 8MP Omnivision OV8858 as front camera and has a user-replaceable 3000mAh Samsung J7-series battery. 

The phone has hardware kill switches for shutting down network connections, microphone, speaker, and cameras. The device has pogo pins for attachable backs compatible with the  original PinePhone.

Software 
The device ships with Manjaro ARM, with Plasma Mobile as the user interface, though users are free to switch to other operating systems. 

U-Boot is used as the default boot loader and it supports booting from a SD card. The bootloader can be replaced, as there are alternatives, such as Tow-boot. The main image sensor driver has been added to the mainline kernel by Sony. Modem firmware of the Quectel EG25-G is based on a proprietary Android userspace, though an unofficial open-source version exists (actually mostly open-source: the custom firmware replaces most proprietary components, except for baseband firmware and the TrustZone kernel, which is signed by Qualcomm).

In the middle of 2022, the software stack was under development, resulting in the hardware not supporting the software. The first images from the camera were taken in May 2022. Most widely-supported hardware is in a heavily patched downstream kernel called Megi kernel. There is alternative operating systems focusing on mainline Linux kernel support, such as PostmarketOS.

See also 

 List of open-source mobile phones
 Comparison of open-source mobile phones

References

External links 
 PinePhone Pro at Pine64 wiki
 Martijn Braam, 15.10.2021, The PinePhone Pro (comparisation of pre-release version of Pinephone pro internals vs Pinephone)

Open-source mobile phones